Michael Francis Crotty (born 26 March 1970) is an Irish Roman Catholic prelate who is Titular Archbishop of Lindisfarne and has served as Apostolic Nuncio to Burkina Faso and to Niger ince 2020.

Early life and education
Crotty was born in Mallow, County Cork, on 26 March 1970, to Timothy and Mary Crotty, and grew up in Skeheen, Mitchelstown.

He attended primary school at Ballygiblin National School and secondary school at the Christian Brothers school in Mitchelstown. Crotty studied for the priesthood at St Patrick's College, Maynooth, completing a Bachelor of Arts in anthropology and modern history from the National University of Ireland in 1990 and a Bachelor of Divinity from the Pontifical University in 1993.

He was ordained a priest for the Diocese of Cloyne on 3 July 1994.

Presbyteral ministry 
Following ordination, Crotty was appointed to further studies at the Pontifical Irish College and the Pontifical Gregorian University, Rome, completing a licentiate in ecclesiastical history at the Pontifical Gregorian University in 1997, a licentiate in canon law in 1999 and a doctorate in ecclesiastical history in 2001.

He was appointed Chaplain of His Holiness, with the title of Monsignor, by Pope Benedict XVI in 2005, and subsequently as Prelate of Honour of His Holiness by Pope Francis in 2014.

Diplomatic career 
Crotty entered the Pontifical Ecclesiastical Academy in 1997, in preparation for a diplomatic career for the Holy See.

Upon completion of studies at the Pontifical Ecclesiastical Academy, he entered the diplomatic service of the Holy See on 1 July 2001, with his first diplomatic appointment as secretary of the Apostolic Nunciature to Kenya. In that role, Crotty also served as deputy head of mission of the Permanent Observer Mission of the Holy See to UNEP and UN-HABITAT.

In 2004 he was appointed secretary of the Apostolic Nunciature to Canada, and in 2007 first secretary of the Apostolic Nunciatures to Iraq and Jordan. In 2009 he was appointed to the Section for Relations with States of the Secretariat of State of the Holy See, and in 2017 first counsellor of the Apostolic Nunciature to Spain.

Episcopate

Titular Archbishop of Lindisfarne and Apostolic Nuncio to Burkina Faso 
Crotty was appointed titular Archbishop of Lindisfarne and Apostolic Nuncio to Burkina Faso by Pope Francis on 1 February 2020.

On 15 August 2020 he received episcopal consecration at the hands of the Secretary of the Section for Relations with States of the Secretariat of State of the Holy See, Archbishop Paul Gallagher, in St Colman's Cathedral, Cobh.

Apostolic Nuncio to Niger 
In addition to his appointment as Nuncio to Burkina Faso, Crotty was subsequently appointed likewise simultaneously Apostolic Nuncio to Niger by Pope Francis on 25 April.

See also
 List of heads of the diplomatic missions of the Holy See

References

External links 

 Archbishop Michael Francis Crotty on Catholic-Hierarchy.org
 Archbishop Michael Francis Crotty on GCatholic

1970 births
Living people
People from County Cork
Alumni of St Patrick's College, Maynooth
Pontifical Gregorian University alumni
Pontifical Ecclesiastical Academy alumni
21st-century Roman Catholic titular archbishops
Pontifical Irish College alumni
Apostolic Nuncios to Burkina Faso
Apostolic Nuncios to Niger
Diplomats of the Holy See
Irish Roman Catholic archbishops
Irish Roman Catholic titular bishops